Orzowei is a 1955 novel by Italian writer Alberto Manzi. It is an anti-racist educational story set in Southern Africa. Adaptations of the novel include a movie (Orzowei, il figlio della savana, 1976) and a popular TV series (1977).

Plot
Isa is a white boy who is abandoned in the jungle somewhere in Southern Africa. He is found and adopted by an old couple of a Swazi tribe. Isa is somewhat isolated in the tribe because of his white skin, and gets nicknamed "Orzowei", "the foundling"; his main antagonist is Mesei, the chief's son. Also because of his white skin, Isa is not accepted in the warrior society, despite successfully completing a painful initiation rite. He ultimately chooses to leave the village, and later joins a tribe of Bushmen. The wise Bushman Pao accepts him in his family and teaches him love and respect for all people, independent of colour. When the Swazi and Bushmen get on a war footing, Pao's teachings help Isa put an end to the conflict, thereby beating his all-time enemy Mesei.

Adaptation

The novel was first adapted as a movie in an Italian/German 1976 production entitled Orzowei, il figlio della savana ("Orzowei, son of the savannah"). In 1977, the TV-series  was aired on RAI 1 (Italy's primary national television) featuring Peter Marshall as Orzowei. The TV-series was very popular, partly due to a very successful soundtrack by the Oliver Onions.

In June 1984, Davide Fabbri provided a drawn cover for the book .

References

External links

20th-century Italian novels
Novels set in Africa
1955 novels
Italian television series
1970s Italian television series
1977 German television series debuts
1977 Italian television series debuts
1977 German television series endings
1977 Italian television series endings
Films scored by Guido & Maurizio De Angelis
ZDF original programming